The Geographical Regions of South Carolina refers to the three major geographical regions of South Carolina: the Appalachian Mountains in the west, the central Piedmont region, and the eastern Atlantic Coastal Plain. The largest region in the state is the Piedmont (United States) located between the Mountains and the Carolina Sandhills, while the smallest in region in the state is the Mountains also known as the Blue Ridge Range.

Mountains
The Mountains of South Carolina refers to the Blue Ridge Mountains, a province of the larger Appalachian Mountain Chain, that stretches from Maine to Alabama, is the smallest geographical region in the whole state. In South Carolina, this regions consists mostly of igneous and metamorphic rocks of Precambrian age.  The highest point in the South Carolina mountains is Sassafras Mountain rising at an elevation of around 3,533 ft (1,078 m). There are also three major parks located in this area, Table Rock State Park, Caesars Head State Park, and Oconee State Park. The only cities located in this region are Walhalla and Landrum as well as many other small towns. Along with the major parks, there are also a few popular tourist attractions, including the Chattooga River, Sumter National Forest, Lake Jocassee and the Cherokee Parkway.

Piedmont
The largest region in the state is the Piedmont (United States).  In South Carolina, this region consists mostly of igneous and metamorphic rocks of Paleozoic age.  The eastern boundary of the Piedmont is the Fall Line.

Coastal Plain
The Coastal Plain refers the region to the east and south of the Fall Line, and is characterized by sedimentary rocks of Cretaceous and Cenozoic age, as well as younger sediments. The Coastal Plain is a relatively flat and fertile area of land. The Coastal Plain extends from the Fall Line to the Atlantic Ocean. Today the Coastal Plain is home to most of South Carolina's farming and textile industry because of the fertile land. The Coastal plain is home to one of South Carolina's major cities, Charleston.

Myrtle Beach, Hilton Head Island, Florence and other cities can be found in the Coastal Plains. There are also many barrier islands located in the region.

Sandhills
The Carolina Sandhills is a 10-35 mi wide physiographic region within the innermost part of the Atlantic Coastal Plain province.  The northern extent of the Carolina Sandhills is located near Fayetteville in North Carolina, and the Carolina Sandhills extend south and southwestward into South Carolina and Georgia. The Sandhills is home to Sand Hills State Forest, part of the Congaree River, and the state capital of Columbia.  The Carolina Sandhills are interpreted as eolian (wind-blown) sand sheets and dunes that were mobilized episodically from approximately 75,000 to 6,000 years ago. Most of the published luminescence ages from the sand are coincident with the last glaciation, a time when the southeastern United States was characterized by colder air temperatures and stronger winds.

References

 
Sandhills (Carolina)